Mahesh Bhupathi and Leander Paes were the defending champions. They were both present but did not compete together.
Bhupathi partnered with Martin Damm, but lost in the quarterfinals to Wayne Black and Kevin Ullyett.
Paes partnered with Nenad Zimonjić, but lost in the second round to Jonathan Erlich and Andy Ram.

Wayne Black and Kevin Ullyett won in the final 6–7(5–7), 6–3, 6–0, against Jonathan Erlich and Andy Ram.

Seeds
All seeds receive a bye into the second round.

Draw

Finals

Top half

Bottom half

External links
Association of Tennis Professionals (ATP) doubles draw

Masters - Doubles